The Alabama Circuit Courts are the state trial courts of general jurisdiction in the State of Alabama. The Circuit Courts have jurisdiction to hear civil and criminal cases. For civil cases, the courts has authority to try cases with an amount in controversy of more than $3,000 and has exclusive original jurisdiction over claims for more than $10,000. The Circuit Courts are the criminal trial courts for most felony charges, and for some misdemeanors and lesser included offenses. The Circuit Courts also have appellate jurisdiction over certain cases arising from the Alabama District Courts (the trial courts of limited jurisdiction in Alabama).

The state has 148 Circuit Court judges divided among 41 judicial circuits with the number of judges to each circuit set by acts of the Alabama Legislature. The legislature distribution is roughly based upon caseloads of the various circuits. The largest circuit in the state is the 10th Judicial Circuit which encompasses Jefferson County (approximately 20
% of the state's population) and is the seat of 27 of the judges. The smallest circuits are the 2nd, 3rd, 24th, 34th, 35th, 36th, 40th, and 41st which each contain just a single judge and represent many of the smallest population counties in the state.

Circuit Judges are elected to six-year terms in partisan elections with no limit on the number of terms. Judges may not seek re-election upon turning seventy years of age. The partisan alignment of the Circuit Judges following the 2018 general election is 92 Republicans, 55 Democrats, and 1 Independent.  However, a large majority (35) of the Democrats 55 judgeships are in just two counties (Jefferson and Montgomery) while the Republican judgeships are spread among 45 different counties.  In the event of a vacancy during a term of office, the Governor of Alabama usually has the authority to fill the unexpired terms. However, a limited number of the circuits (i.e., the 10th, 18th, 28th Circuits) have judicial commissions which submit nominees from which the Governor is obligated to choose. Upon retirement judges may choose to become active retired where they serve as special judges when called upon and are still held to the cannon of ethics. Judges may also serve as special judges outside of their respective circuit while holding office when called upon.

1st Circuit

Counties Served: Choctaw, Clarke, Washington

Circuit Seats: Choctaw County Courthouse (Butler), Clarke County Courthouse (Grove Hill), Washington County Courthouse (Chatom)

2nd Circuit

Counties Served: Butler, Crenshaw, Lowndes

District Seats: Butler County Courthouse (Greenville), Crenshaw County Courthouse (Luverne), Lowndes County Courthouse (Hayneville)

3rd Circuit

Counties Served: Barbour, Bullock

District Seats: Barbour County Courthouse (Clayton), Bullock County Courthouse (Union Springs)

4th Circuit

Counties Served: Bibb, Dallas, Hale, Perry, Wilcox

District Seats: Bibb County Courthouse (Centreville), Dallas County Courthouse (Selma), Hale County Courthouse (Greensboro) Perry County Courthouse (Marion), Wilcox County Courthouse (Camden)

5th Circuit
Counties Served: Chambers, Macon, Randolph, Tallapoosa

6th Circuit
Counties Served: Tuscaloosa

7th Circuit
Counties Served: Calhoun, Cleburne

8th Circuit
Counties Served: Morgan

9th Circuit
Counties Served: Cherokee, DeKalb

10th Circuit
Counties Served: Jefferson

11th Circuit
Counties Served: Lauderdale

12th Circuit
Counties Served: Coffee, Pike

13th Circuit
Counties Served: Mobile

14th Circuit
Counties Served: Walker

15th Circuit
Counties Served: Montgomery

16th Circuit
Counties Served: Etowah

17th Circuit
Counties Served: Greene, Marengo, Sumter 

Judge Eddie Hardaway is the only Judge covering all three Counties

18th Circuit
Counties Served: Shelby

19th Circuit
Counties Served: Autauga, Chilton, Elmore

20th Circuit
Counties Served: Henry, Houston

21st Circuit
Counties Served: Escambia

22nd Circuit
Counties Served: Covington

23rd Circuit
Counties Served: Madison

24th Circuit
Counties Served: Fayette, Lamar, Pickens

25th Circuit
Counties Served: Marion, Winston

26th Circuit
Counties Served: Russell

27th Circuit
Counties Served: Marshall

28th Circuit
Counties Served: Baldwin

Circuit Court Judges

Carmen Bosch,
Jody W. Bishop,
C. Joseph Norton,
Scott P. Taylor,
J. Clark Stankoski

29th Circuit
Counties Served: Talledega

30th Circuit
Counties Served: St. Clair

31st Circuit
Counties Served: Colbert

32nd Circuit
Counties Served: Cullman

33rd Circuit
Counties Served: Dale, Geneva

34th Circuit
Counties Served: Franklin

35th Circuit
Counties Served: Conecuh, Monroe

36th Circuit
Counties Served: Lawrence

37th Circuit
Counties Served: Lee

38th Circuit
Counties Served: Jackson

39th Circuit
Counties Served: Limestone

40th Circuit
Counties Served: Clay, Coosa

41st Circuit
Counties Served: Blount

See also
 Courts of Alabama
 Supreme Court of Alabama
 Alabama Court of Criminal Appeals
 Alabama Court of Civil Appeals

References

Circuit
Alabama